The Francevillian biota (Referred to also as "Gabon macrofossils", "Gabonionta" or "Francevillian group fossils") are a collection of 2.1-billion-year-old Palaeoproterozoic, macroscopic fossils of organisms known from the Palaeoproterozoic Francevillian B Formation in Gabon, a black shale province notable for its lack of any noticeable metamorphism. The fossils are postulated to be evidence of the earliest form of Eukaryotes. They were discovered by an international team led by Moroccan-French geologist Abderrazak El Albani, of the University of Poitiers, France. While they have yet to be assigned to a formal taxonomic position, they have been informally and collectively referred to as the "Gabonionta" by the Natural History Museum Vienna in 2014.

Morphology

Their bodies were flattened disks with a characteristic morphology, including circular and elongated individuals. A spherical to ellipsoidal central body is bounded by radial structures. The fossils show three-dimensionality and coordinated growth. Cell-cell communication must be assumed as it existed before multi-cellularity arose.

A newer 2014 study by El Albani et al. describes multiple types of fossils with different morphologies. There are convoluted tubes, and "string of pearls"-like structures that terminate in a "flower". This is similar to dictyostelid slime molds, amoebal organisms that form multicellular assemblies to migrate. However, dictyostelids are terrestrial, not marine organisms so the structures cannot simply be dictyostelids. Among known fossils, the Ediacaran Nemiana and Beltanelloides are most similar when compared to the "string of pearls".

Locality

The findings come from shales of the Franceville basin with a high fossil density of up to 40 individuals per square meter. Presumably, the organisms survived at the bottom in shallow sea water in colonies. The geochemistry of the fossil site indicates that they lived on the sediment under an oxygenated water column of a prograding delta, and they might have engaged in aerobic respiration.

Interpretations
In describing the fossils, El Albani and colleagues described them as colonial organisms with possible affinities to eukaryotes, akin to microbial mats, albeit unlike any known structures in the fossil record, yet noting the complexity of the fossils and presence of sterane as suggestive of possible eukaryote identity. In a concurrent news report in Nature, paleontologist Philip Donoghue of Bristol University advocates a more conservative approach pending further evidence before calling them eukaryotes.

Another view, held by Yale's Adolf Seilacher, interprets the fossils as not organisms at all, but rather pseudofossils of inorganic pyrites. El Albani et al. (2014) explicitly disputes Seilacher's interpretation. Both pyritized and unpyritized impressions of the structures remain, as well as lightly pyritized forms. The structures formed in a single event, at the same time as the sediment. This is demonstrated by the uniform distribution of sulfur isotope ratios within the sample. In pyrite flowers, which crystallize slowly, the isotope ratio would vary within the structure. For structures that resemble pollen, chemical analysis also shows that the material in the walls of the "pollen" contains organic material.

Fate 
The Francevillian biota disappears and is absent in the overlying black shale. El Albani attributes this to their extinction. The biota formed with the Great Oxidation Event, a temporary increase in atmospheric oxygen, and became extinct from marine anoxia when the event was terminated by the drop in oxygen levels of the Lomagundi event. The biota represents the earliest known experiment in multicellularity.

See also

Ediacaran biota
History of life
Francevillian B Formation
Franceville basin

References

Prehistoric biotas
Proterozoic life
Precambrian fossils
Paleoproterozoic
Fossils of Gabon